Jaroslav Stančo (29 September 1949 – 5 July 2011) was a Czech volleyball player. He competed at the 1972 Summer Olympics and the 1976 Summer Olympics.

References

1949 births
2011 deaths
Czech men's volleyball players
Olympic volleyball players of Czechoslovakia
Volleyball players at the 1972 Summer Olympics
Volleyball players at the 1976 Summer Olympics
Sportspeople from Brno